Metro Chinese Weekly, is a Chinese language newspaper based in Philadelphia, Pennsylvania, published every Friday serving the Greater Philadelphia area including Northern Delaware and Southern New Jersey. It is published by New Mainstream Press, a publishing company that caters specifically to the Asian-American communities. The Metro Chinese Weekly is found within either its signature red metal box on the streets or black wooden stands within stores in highly concentrated Asian communities in Chinatown, Northeast Philadelphia, and South Philadelphia as well as the growing Asian-American communities in the suburbs.

History
The weekly is the flagship publication of New Mainstream Press, Inc. started in 2007 by Dan Tsao. Tsao immigrated from Wenling, a small coastal city in the Zhejiang province of China. In 1994, Tsao attended Penn State University, graduating in 1999. Tsao's goal was to have a publication that was well respected and did not have a poor format, nor low editorial quality found commonly in other ethnic newspapers such as ones that are dominated with advertisement space throughout the paper.

Growth
Since its inception, the Metro Chinese Weekly has grown each year. Originating with 24 pages at its Bala Cynwyd location, it has grown to over 80 pages and moved to its current larger location in Chinatown. With the increased business for the Chinese oriented newspaper, the Metro Viet News was soon established.

Sections
Sections within the Metro Chinese Weekly include Community News & Events, Small Businesses, Real Estate, Classifieds, Automotive, Foods & Dining, and Services such as Immigration & Law, Finance, Health. There are also smaller sections such as Chicken Soup for the Soul which entails short stories providing insight and experience.

References

External links
Company Website

Chinese-American culture in Pennsylvania
Newspapers published in Philadelphia
Philadelphia Weekly
Publications established in 2007
2007 establishments in Pennsylvania